Greetings From Cairo, Illinois is a 2005 concept album and historical album by Stace England with songs referencing the history of Cairo, Illinois from 1858 to 2005. The project encompassed five years of research and two years of writing and recording the music.

The songs concern people, places and things throughout Cairo's history including Ulysses S. Grant, the American Civil War, blues music, lynching, the Great Migration, Civil Rights struggles, vigilante groups, Jesse Jackson, political corruption, economic decline and hope for renewal.

The album was the subject of a radio documentary on VPRO Dutch National Broadcasting produced by noted musicologist and author Jan Donkers, and features a vocal performance by alternative country pioneer Jason Ringenberg of Jason & the Scorchers. The album's title and cover art are inspired by Bruce Springsteen's debut, Greetings from Asbury Park, N.J.

Track listing 
"Goin' Down to Cairo" – 1:54
"Cairo Blues" – 3:52
"Grant Slept Here" – 3:25
"Equal Opportunity Lynch Mob" – 3:56
"The North Starts in Cairo" – 3:29
"Far from the Tree" – 4:04
"White Hats" – 4:54
"Jesse's Comin' to Town" – 4:58
"Buy My Votes" – 3:34
"Prosperity Train" – 3:02
"Can't We All Get Along" – 3:46

See also

2005 in music
Illinois – a 2005 album from Sufjan Stevens about Illinois

External links 
  Stace England Official Site
  Gnashville Sounds Records

2005 albums
Cairo, Illinois
Concept albums
Illinois in fiction